Sweet grass or sweetgrass may refer to:

Plants
 Hierochloe odorata (sweet grass or holy grass), from northern North America and Eurasia
 Sweet-grass or mannagrass, any of the many species in the genus Glyceria
 Anthoxanthum odoratum, Sweet vernal grass, native to Eurasia
 Muhlenbergia sericea, synonym Muhlenbergia filipes, native to the southeastern United States
 colloquially for Cannabis, a psychoactive plant

Places
 Sweet Grass, Montana, United States
 Sweet Grass County, Montana, United States
 Sweet Grass Creek, Montana, United States
 Sweet Grass Hills, Montana, United States
 Sweet Grass, Edmonton, Canada
 Sweetgrass First Nation, Saskatchewan, Canada

Other uses
 Sweet Grass (Cree chief) (1815–1877)
 Sweetgrass (film), a 2009 documentary